Shiraz is the fifth-most-populous city of Iran and the capital of Fars Province, which has been historically known as Pars and Persis. As of the 2016 national census, the population of the city was 1,565,572 people, and its built-up area with Sadra was home to almost 1,800,000 inhabitants. A census in 2021 showed an increase in the city's population to 1,995,500 people. Shiraz is located in southwestern Iran on the  seasonal river. Founded in the early Islamic period, the city has a moderate climate and has been a regional trade center for over a thousand years.

The earliest reference to the city, as Tiraziš, is on Elamite clay tablets dated to 2000 BCE. The modern city was founded by Sasanian dynasty and restored by the Umayyad Caliphate in 693 CE and grew prominent under the successive Iranian Saffarid and Buyid dynasties in the 9th and 10th–11th centuries, respectively. In the 13th century, Shiraz became a leading center of the arts and letters, due to the encouragement of its ruler and the presence of many Persian scholars and artists.
Two famous poets of Iran, Hafez and Saadi, are from Shiraz, whose tombs are located on the north side of the current city boundaries.

Shiraz is one of the top tourist cities Iran and it is known as the city of poets, literature, and flowers. It is also considered by many Iranians to be the city of gardens due to the presence of many gardens and fruit trees that can be seen throughout the city, such as Eram Garden. Shiraz is also a famous tourist destination in the world. Every year many tourists come around the world visit Shiraz. Shiraz has historically had major Jewish and Christian communities. Dominant industries in the city include the production of cement, sugar, fertilizers, textile products, wood products, metalwork, and rugs. Shiraz also has a major oil refinery and is a major centre for Iran's electronic industries: 53 percent of Iran's electronic investment has been centred in Shiraz. The city is home to Iran's first solar powerplant. Recently, Shiraz's first wind turbine has been installed above Mount Babakuhi near the city.

Etymology
 Phonetically, this is interpreted as /tiračis/ or /ćiračis/. This name became Old Persian /širājiš/; through regular sound change comes the modern Persian name Shirāz. The name Shiraz also appears on clay sealings found at a 2nd-century CE Sassanid ruin, east of the city. By some of the native writers, the name Shiraz has derived from a son of Tahmuras, the third Shāh (King) of the world according to Ferdowsi's Shāhnāma.

History

Pre-Islamic era
Though, there is no definitive record of its existence prior to the late 7th century CE, few archaeological finds dating from 1933 and beyond indicate that the site or vicinity of Shiraz was likely settled in the pre-Islamic era as early as the 6th century BCE. A number of Hakhamanish and Sasanian-era remains have been discovered around the city, including reliefs at Barm-e Delak to the east and Guyim to the northwest, and ruins of Sasanian fortresses at Qasr-e Abu Nasr to the east and Fahandezh. The latter is identified with the fortress of Shahmobad mentioned as being in Shiraz by the 10th-century geographical work, Hudud al-'alam. the Sasanian and early Islamic-era clay seals found at Qasr-e-Abu Nasr mention the name "Shiraz" alongside the name of the Sasanian administrative district of the area, Ardashir-Khwarrah. According to the diplomat and academic John Limbert, this indicates that the name "Shiraz" is traced back to the Elamite "Shirrazish" and that both refer to a settlement that existed at the site of Qasr-e-Abu Nasr. 

Interpretations of what type of settlement ancient Shiraz was vary. According to Berney and Ring, the lack of references to Shiraz in early Persian sources suggests the city could not have been more than a way-station in the plain in which it lies. On the other hand, according to Abdolmajed Arfaee, Achaemenid-era Shiraz must have been one of the most important settlements in the area. He bases this on its frequent appearance in the Persepolis Administrative Archives (84 different tablets) as well as the number of workers present – in groups as large as 490. Most textual references to Shiraz involve rations for workers; it is never mentioned as a travel destination. Arfaee says that Sasanian Shiraz was relatively insignificant before its re-foundation in the early Islamic period. According to John Limbert, however, Shiraz prospered between the 6th and 8th-centuries CE and was possibly the administrative center for the Shiraz plain until the modern city of Shiraz was founded.

Early Islamic era
The present city of Shiraz was founded or restored in 693 by Muhammad ibn Yusuf al-Thaqafi, the brother of the Umayyad viceroy of the eastern half of the caliphate, al-Hajjaj ibn Yusuf, or the latter's kinsman Muhammad ibn Qasim. The Arab Muslim army had conquered the wider region of Fars, where the site of Shiraz is located, in several expeditions launched from their garrison town of Basra between 640 and 653, and specifically captured the immediate area around Shiraz early on, in 641. This area did not possess any cities, though there were a number of forts which were forced to pay tribute to the Arabs. The Sasanians held firm in Istakhr, their capital in Fars, until the Arabs captured it in a heavy battle in 653, during which the plain of Shiraz had been utilized as an Arab campground. Because of Istakhr's deep association with the Sasanian Empire and the Zoroastrian religion, the Arabs sought to establish in nearby Shiraz a rival cultural and administrative center. Thus, during its initial founding in 693, the city was planned to be much larger than Isfahan. However, the initial ambitions were not realized and Shiraz remained a "provincial backwater" in the shadow of Istakhr until at least the late 9th century, according to Limbert. This is partly attributed to the reticence of the largely Zoroastrian population of Fars to inhabit the Islamic Arab city. As the population gradually shifted to Islam from Zoroastrianism and Istakhr concurrently declined, Shiraz grew into the practical center of Fars.

According to Muslim traditional sources, Shiraz was used as a hideout by three of the brothers of the Shia Muslim imam Ali al-Ridha following the latter's death in 817/18 and later by one of the brothers' sons, Ali ibn Hamza ibn Musa, until he was found and executed by the Abbasid authorities in circa 835. As Abbasid authority waned during this period, regional dynasties emerged with considerable autonomy. In the late 9th century, the Iranian Muslim Saffarid dynasty under Ya'qub ibn al-Layth made Shiraz the capital of their autonomous state, which encompassed most of modern-day Iran. In 894, Ya'qub's brother and successor, Amr, founded the city's first congregational mosque, today known as the Atigh Jame' Mosque.

The Iranian Buyid dynasty under Imad al-Dawla Ali ibn Buya ousted the Saffarids in 933 and his nephew and successor, 'Adud al-Dawla Fana Khusraw, took over and ruled Fars between 949 and 983, and added Iraq, the seat of the Abbasid Caliphate, to his Shiraz-based domains in 977; the Abbasids thenceforth became a puppet state of the Shiraz-based dynasty. Shiraz developed into the largest and most prosperous city of Fars and an important economic and cultural center of the caliphate. Adud al-Dawla had a large library, a hospital and several mosques, bazaars, caravanserais, palaces and gardens built in the city, while south of it he erected a fortified camp for his troops, known as Kard Fana Khusraw, in 974. One of the congregational mosques built by Adud al-Dawla has survived until the present day. Two Zoroastrian fire temples also existed in Shiraz, catering to the Persians who had not converted to Islam. One of Adud al-Dawla's palaces stretched out for nearly three miles and consisted of 360 rooms.

Under the Buyids, Shiraz was divided into twelve quarters and had eight gates. It owed its economic prosperity to the booming agricultural trade of Fars. The city largely consumed the agricultural products of the province, including grapes, linen, wool, cotton, collyrium, rose, violet and palm-blossom water. It was also a market for rug weavers and painters to sell their pricey products, a testament to the residents' wealth. At the time, wine, grains, gold and silver were exported from the Farsi port cities of Siraf and Najairam. Adud al-Dawla patronized scientific, medical and Islamic religious research in Shiraz.

The city was spared destruction by the invading Mongols, when its local ruler offered tributes and submission to Genghis Khan. Shiraz was again spared by Tamerlane, when in 1382 the local monarch, Shah Shoja agreed to submit to the invader. In the 13th century, Shiraz became a leading center of the arts and letters, thanks to the encouragement of its ruler and the presence of many Persian scholars and artists. For this reason the city was named by classical geographers Dar al-'Elm, the House of Knowledge. Among the Iranian poets, mystics and philosophers born in Shiraz were the poets Sa'di and Hafiz, the mystic Ruzbehan, and the philosopher Mulla Sadra. Thus Shiraz has been nicknamed "The Athens of Iran".
As early as the 11th century, several hundred thousand people inhabited Shiraz. In the 14th century Shiraz had sixty thousand inhabitants. During the 16th century it had a population of 200,000 people, which by the mid-18th century had decreased to only 55,000.

Safavid era

In 1504, Shiraz was captured by the forces of Ismail I, the founder of the Safavid dynasty. Throughout the Safavid empire (1501–1722) Shiraz remained a provincial capital and Emam Qoli Khan, the governor of Fars under Shah Abbas I, constructed many palaces and ornate buildings in the same style as those built during the same period in Isfahan, the capital of the Empire. After the fall of the Safavids, Shiraz suffered a period of decline, worsened by the raids of the Afghans and the rebellion of its governor against Nader Shah; the latter sent troops to suppress the revolt. The city was besieged for many months and eventually sacked. At the time of Nader Shah's murder in 1747, most of the historical buildings of the city were damaged or ruined, and its population fell to 50,000, one-quarter of that during the 16th century.

Shiraz soon returned to prosperity under the rule of Karim Khan Zand, who made it his capital in 1762. Employing more than 12,000 workers, he constructed a royal district with a fortress, many administrative buildings, a mosque, and one of the finest covered bazaars in Iran. He had a moat built around the city, constructed an irrigation and drainage system, and rebuilt the city walls. However, Karim Khan's heirs failed to secure his gains. When Agha Mohammad Khan, the founder of the Qajar dynasty, eventually came to power, he wreaked his revenge on Shiraz by destroying the city's fortifications and moving the national capital to Tehran. Although lowered to the rank of a provincial capital, Shiraz maintained a level of prosperity as a result of the continuing importance of the trade route to the Persian Gulf. Its governorship was a royal prerogative throughout the Qajar dynasty. Many of the famous gardens, buildings and residences built during this time contribute to the city's present skyline.

Shiraz is the birthplace of the co-founder of the Baháʼí Faith, the Báb (Siyyid 'Ali-Muhammad, 1819–1850). In this city, on the evening of 22 May 1844, he first declared his mission as the bearer of a new divine revelation. For this reason Shiraz is a holy city for Baháʼís, and the city, particularly the house of the Báb, was identified as a place of pilgrimage. Due to the hostile climate towards Baháʼís in Iran, the house has been the target of repeated attacks; the house was destroyed in 1979, to be paved over two years later and made into a public square.

In 1910, a pogrom of the Jewish quarter started after false rumours that the Jews had ritually murdered a Muslim girl. In the course of the riots, 12 Jews were murdered and about 50 were injured, and the 6,000 Jews of Shiraz were robbed of all their possessions.

During the Pahlavi dynasty, Shiraz became the center of attention again. Many important landmarks like Tombs of Poets' such as Sa'di and Hafiz, were constructed and presented to the public.

Lacking any great industrial, religious or strategic importance, Shiraz became an administrative center, although its population has nevertheless grown considerably since the 1979 revolution.

Modern times

The city's municipality and other related institutions have initiated restoration and reconstruction projects.

Some of the most recent projects have been the complete restoration of the Arg of Karim Khan and of the Vakil Bath, as well as a comprehensive plan for the preservation of the old city quarters. Other noteworthy initiatives include the total renovation of the Qur'an Gate and the mausoleum of the poet Khwaju Kermani, both located in the Allah-u-Akbar Gorge, as well as the restoration and expansion of the mausoleum of the famous Shiraz-born poets Hafiz and Saadi.

Several different construction projects are currently underway that will modernize the city's infrastructure.

After the Iranian Revolution, Shiraz was re-established as the capital of Iranian Art and Culture among the people. Shiraz is known as the capital of Persian Art, Culture and Literature. However, the current government has tried to re-brand the city as "Sevomin haram-e ahle beit" meaning "Third home of Saints" referring to the Shahcheragh shrine and some other holy places in the city.

Geography

Shiraz is located in the south of Iran and the northwest of Fars province.

A seasonal river, Dry River, flows through the northern part of the city and on into Maharloo Lake. As of 1920, the area had a large forest of oak trees.

Gardens
Shiraz contains a considerable number of gardens. Due to population growth in the city, many of these gardens may be lost to give way to new developments. Although some measures have been taken by the Municipality to preserve these gardens, many illegal developments still endanger them.

Climate

Shiraz's climate has distinct seasons, and is overall classed as a cold semi-arid climate (Köppen climate classification BSk), though it is only a little short of a hot semi-arid climate (BSh) or a hot-summer Mediterranean climate (Köppen climate classification Csa). Winters are cool, with average low temperatures below freezing in December and January. Around  of rain falls each year, almost entirely in the winter months, though in some cases as much as this has fallen in a single month (as in January 1965 and December 2004), whilst in the year from July 1965 to June 1966 as little as  fell. Due to Shiraz' high elevation and low latitude, the UV index is extremely high during summer which is further exacerbated by the high frequency of sunshine.

Despite being in a relatively dry climate, extreme weather is not a rare occasion. On 25 March 2019, flash floods from heavy rains has resulted in 19 deaths and over 200 injuries.

Economy

  
Shiraz is the economic center of southern Iran. The second half of the 19th century witnessed certain economic developments that greatly changed the economy of Shiraz. The opening of the Suez Canal in 1869 allowed the extensive import into southern Iran of inexpensive European factory-made goods, either directly from Europe or via India. Farmers in unprecedented numbers began planting cash crops such as opium poppy, tobacco, and cotton. Many of these export crops passed through Shiraz on their way to the Persian Gulf. Iranian long-distance merchants from Fars developed marketing networks for these commodities, establishing trading houses in Bombay, Calcutta, Port Said, Istanbul and even Hong Kong.

Shiraz's economic base is in its provincial products, which include grapes, citrus fruits, cotton and rice. Industries such as cement production, sugar, fertilizers, textile products, wood products, metalwork and rugs dominate. Shirāz also has a major oil refinery and is also a major center for Iran's electronic industries. 53% of Iran's electronic investment has been centered in Shiraz.
Agriculture has always been a major part of the economy in and around Shiraz. This is partially due to a relative abundance of water compared to the surrounding deserts. Shirāz is famous for its carpet production and flowers as well. Viticulture has a long history in the region, and Shirazi wine used to be produced here. Shiraz is also an Iranian center for IT, communication, electronic industry, and transportation.

The Shiraz Special Economic Zone or the SEEZ was established in 2000 with the purpose of boosting manufacturing in electronics and communications.

Shiraz is a major shopping destination in Iran and the Middle East, with more than 25 malls and 10 bazaars.

The Persian Gulf Complex, located at the north end of the city, is the largest mall in the world in terms of the number of shops.

The Vakil Bazaar, one of the oldest bazaars in the world, is located in the old city centre of Shiraz. Featuring courtyards, caravansarais, and bath houses, its shops sell different types of spices, Persian rugs, copper handicrafts and antiques.

The city is served by Refah Chain Stores Co., Iran Hyper Star, Isfahan City Center, Shahrvand Chain Stores Inc., Ofoq Kourosh chain store.

Demographics

, Shiraz has a population of 1,700,665 the majority of whom are Persian. Most of the population of Shiraz are Muslim. Shiraz also was home to a 20,000-strong Jewish community, although most emigrated to the United States and Israel in the latter half of the 20th century. Along with Tehran and Isfahan, Shiraz is one of the handful of Iranian cities with a sizable Jewish population and more than one active synagogue.

Shiraz also has a significant Baháʼí Faith population, the largest in the country after Tehran.

There are currently two functioning churches in Shiraz, one Armenian, the other, Anglican.

Culture

Shiraz is known as the city of poets, gardens, wine, nightingales and flowers. The crafts of Shiraz consist of inlaid mosaic work of triangular design; silver-ware; carpet-weaving, and the making of the rugs called gilim (Shiraz Kilim) and the blanket called Jajim in the villages and among the tribes.

The garden is an important part of Iranian culture. There are many old gardens in Shiraz such as the Eram garden and the Afif abad garden. According to some people, Shiraz "disputes with Xeres [or Jerez] in Spain the honour of being the birthplace of sherry." Shirazi wine originates from the city; however, under the current Islamic regime, liquor cannot be consumed except by religious minorities.

Shiraz is proud of being mother land of Hafiz Shirazi, Shiraz is a center for Iranian culture and has produced a number of famous poets. Saadi, a 12th- and 13th-century poet was born in Shiraz. He left his native town at a young age for Baghdad to study Arabic literature and Islamic sciences at Al-Nizamiyya of Baghdad. When he reappeared in his native Shiraz he was an elderly man. Shiraz, under Atabak Abubakr Sa'd ibn Zangy (1231–1260) was enjoying an era of relative tranquility. Saadi was not only welcomed to the city but he was highly respected by the ruler and enumerated among the greats of the province. He seems to have spent the rest of his life in Shiraz. Hafiz, another famous poet and mystic was also born in Shiraz. A number of scientists also originate from Shiraz. Qutb al-Din al-Shirazi, a 13th-century astronomer, mathematician, physician, physicist and scientist was from Shiraz. In his The Limit of Accomplishment concerning Knowledge of the Heavens, he also discussed the possibility of heliocentrism.

Tourism

Tourist attractions in Shiraz
The city is one of the key tourism sites in Iran, its cultural heritage is of global importance. 

 The tombs of Hafiz, Saadi, and Khaju e Kermani (whose tomb is inside a mountain above the city's old Qur'an Gate). Other lesser known tombs are that of Shah Shoja' (the Mozafarid emir of Persia, and patron of Hafiz), and the Haft Tanan mausoleum, where seven Sufi mystics are buried. The Tomb of Baba Kuhi sits atop a mountain overlooking the city, and the tomb of Karim Khan Zand is at the Pars Museum of Shiraz.
 The oldest mosque is Atigh Jame' Mosque, which is one of the older mosques of Iran, followed by Vakil Mosque and Nasir al-Mulk mosque. The Vakil Mosque is situated west of the famous Vakil Bazaar. On the two sides of the entrance gate there are magnificent tile-works and arches. The left and right corridors of the entrance gate are connected to the main room.
 The citadel of Arg of Karim Khan sits adjacent to the Vakil Bazaar and Vakil Bath at the city's central district. The most famous of houses are Zinat-ol-Moluk House and Gahavam's House, both in the old quarters of the city.
 The Qur'an Gate is the entrance to Shiraz. It is located near the gorge of Allah-o-Akbar and is flanked by the Baba Kuhi and Chehel Maqam mountains. The gateway once contained two hand-written Qur'āns by Sultan Ibrahim Bin Shahrukh Gurekani in an upper room, which have now been moved to the Pars Museum.
 The Eram Garden (Bagh-e Eram) in Shiraz is a striking location for visitors with a variety of plants as well as a historic mansion. Although the exact date of the construction of the garden is not clear, historical evidence suggests it was constructed during the Seljuk Dynasty on the orders of the celebrated Seljuk monarch Sanjar. Other historical Persian gardens are Afifabad Garden and The Museum of Weapons, Delgosha Garden and Jahan Nama Garden.

Tourist attractions
 Margoon Waterfall is located in the Fars Province of Iran near the city of Sepidan. Its name means in Persian "snake like".
This cave is near Kazerun in Chogan valley, which was the site of polo (Persian čōgān چُوگان), in the Sasanian period.
 Sangtarashan cave is located in the Jahrom, in southern Iran, it is the largest handmade cave in the world. It has several corridors, columns and openings.
 Palace of Ardashir, also known as the Atash-kadeh, is a castle located on the slopes of the mountain on which Dezh Dokhtar is situated.
 Pooladkaf is a ski resort in the south of Iran. It opened in 2002. In spite of its low latitude, it receives adequate snow due to its high elevation (usually  of snow in February). The skiing season starts in December and lasts to the end of March, or in some years April.
The palace was built in the 5th century AD, and was either a gubernatorial residence or a Zoroastrian fire temple.
 Qal'eh Dokhtar, is a castle made by Ardashir I, in present-day Fars, Iran, in 209 AD. It is located on a mountain slope near the Firouzabad-Kavar road.
 Maharloo Lake. Maharloo is a seasonal salt lake about an hour away from Shiraz, with a dominant pink hue because of the amount of red tide in it; however, the strength of the color differs in various times of the year. It is also known as the pink lake.

Neighborhoods
List of neighborhoods in Shiraz:

 Zargari
 Abivardi
 Farhang Shahr
 Qasrodasht
 Koshan
 Kuye Zahra
 Ma'ali Abad
 Molla Sadra
 Shahcheragh
 Riyasati Avval
 Riyasati Dovvom
 Shahrak-e-Golestan
 Shahrak-e-Sadra
 Tachara
 Zerehi
 Kolbeh Saadi
 Podonak
 Payegah
 Eram
 Bagh-e Nari (Narvan)
 Siahatgar BLVD
 Abiari Ave
 Artesh square (Army Square)
 Bridgestone
 Babakuhi
 Kuye Jamaran(siman)
 Baskul Nader
 Talkhedash
 Kaftarak 
 Sare Dozak
 Chamran
 Sange Siah
 Amir Kabir Blvd
 Modares 
 Dinakan 
 Darvazeh Kazeron 
 Darvaze Isfahan
 Bagh Safa
 Atlasi 
 Derki

 See also: Saadi Street

Higher education
Shiraz is home to a vibrant academic community. The Shiraz University of Medical Sciences was the first university in Shiraz and was founded in 1946. Much older is the august Madrasa-e-Khan, or Khan Theological School, with about 600 students; its tile-covered buildings date from 1627.

Today Shiraz University is the largest university in the province, and one of Iran's best academic centers. Other major universities in or nearby Shiraz are the Islamic Azad University of Shiraz, Shiraz University of Technology, and Shiraz University of Applied Science and Technology.

The Shiraz Regional Library of Science and Technology is the largest provincial library serving the public.

Virtual University of Shiraz is one of the sub colleges of Shiraz University.

Transportation

Airports

Shiraz International Airport serves as the largest airport in the southern region of Iran. After undergoing renovation and redevelopment work in 2005, Shiraz Airport was identified as the second-most-reliable and -modern airport in Iran (after Imam Khomeini International Airport of Tehran) in terms of flight safety including electronic and navigation control systems of its flight tower.

Metro

Construction of a metro system was started in 2001 by the Shiraz Urban Railway Organization. The plan is to create six lines. The length of the third line will be . 21 stations were built in route one.

The first three lines, when completed, will have 32 stations below ground, six above, and one special station connected to the railway station. The first line was started in October 2014 between Shahid Dastgheib (airport) Metro Station and Ehsan stations. A single ticket costs 10000 rials, with trains operating every 15 minutes. Line 1 is extended from the airport To Ehsan Square (northern part).

Bus

Shiraz has 71 bus lines. Iran's third Bus Rapid Transit opened in Shiraz in 2009 with two lines, and a further two planned to open in 2010. Service is free on 5 May, the day of the city.

Rail

Shiraz is connected with the rest of Iran's railway network. The trains arrive and leave from Shiraz railway station, Iran's largest railway station according to surface area. It has passenger trains, operating six days per week to Isfahan, Tehran and Mashad.

Roads

There are 700,000 cars in the city of Shiraz.
 Road 63
 Road 93

Sports

Football is the most popular sport in Shiraz and the city has many teams in this sport. The most notable of these teams is Bargh Shiraz who are one of the oldest teams in Iran, Bargh was once a regular member of the Persian Gulf Pro League; however, financial issues and poor management have led them dropping to League 3 where they currently play. Shiraz's other major football team is Fajr Sepasi who also played in the Persian Gulf Pro League; however, now they play in the second tier Azadegan League. Shiraz is host to a number of smaller and lesser known teams as well, such as Kara Shiraz, New Bargh and Qashaei who all play in League 2.

The main sporting venue in Shiraz is Hafezieh Stadium which can hold up to 20,000 people. The stadium is the venue for many of the cities football matches and has occasionally hosted the Iran national football team. Shiraz is also home to another stadium, Pars Stadium, which was completed in 2017, and can host up to 50,000 spectators.

Notable people

Rulers and political figures
 Absh Khatun, 13th-century ruler
 Karim Khan, the ruler and de facto Shah of Iran from 1760 until 1779, made Shiraz his capital
 Valerie Jarrett, senior advisor to United States President Barack Obama, born in Shiraz to African-American parents.
 Kamran Bagheri Lankarani was Iran's Minister of Health and Medical Education
 Jimmy Delshad, 67th and 70th Mayor of Beverly Hills

Religious figures, philosophers and theologians
 Mu'ayyad fi'l-Din al-Shirazi lived during the Fatimid Caliphate and was considered one of the most learned scholars of that time, known as an author of Islamic books, a poet, and scientist.
 Mulla Sadra, Islamic philosopher, theologian who led the Iranian cultural renaissance in the 17th century
 Siyyid 'Alí Muḥammad Shírází, the founder of Bábism, and one of three central figures of the Baháʼí Faith

Academics and scientists
 Qutb al-Din al-Shirazi, 13th-century Iranian poet and scholar
 Sibawayh, linguist and grammarian of the Arabic language
 Firouz Naderi, scientist and currently the Director for Solar System Exploration at NASA's Jet Propulsion Laboratory (JPL)
 Gholam A. Peyman, inventor of LASIK
 Ali Asghar Khodadoust, Professor of Ophthalmology, originator of the Khodadoust line method
 M. Hashem Pesaran, Iranian Economist, Emeritus Professor of Economics at University of Cambridge
Farshid Delshad, linguist and translator
Reza Negarestani, philosopher and writer

Poets and writers
 Saadi, poet of the medieval period
 Hafez, poet
 Shahriyar Mandanipour, writer
 Simin Daneshvar, novelist and author
 Mehdi Hamidi Shirazi, contemporary poet
 Fereidoon Tavallali, contemporary poet and intellectual
 Abdolali Dastgheib, literary critic writer

Other artists
 Bahram Dabiri, painter and artist
 Shirazeh Houshiary, artist, born in Shiraz in 1955, lives in London
 Arsi Nami award-winning singer and songwriter
 Ebrahim Golestan, writer and filmmaker
 Gholamhossein Saber, artist
 Tooji, singer, model and television host; represented Norway in the Eurovision Song Contest 2012 in Baku, Azerbaijan.
 Bahar Pars, actress.

Others
 Mohammad Namazi, philanthropist & founder of the Namazi hospital in Shiraz. This later became the catalyst for the establishment of Shiraz University of Medical Sciences in 1955; one of the country's top medical schools
 Mohammad Bahmanbeigi, activist, founding father of instructions for tribes in Iran
 Omid Norouzi, Iranian wrestler, world and Olympic champion
 Abbas Dowran, acclaimed fighter jet pilot who died during the Iran–Iraq War

Twin towns – sister cities

Shiraz is twinned with:

 Chongqing, China
 Dushanbe, Tajikistan
 Nanjing, China
 Nicosia, Cyprus
 Pécs, Hungary
 Weimar, Germany

Panoramic view

See also

 1853 Shiraz earthquake – killed at least 9,000 people
 Shiraz Arts Festival
 Shirazi salad – originated from and is named after Shiraz

References

Bibliography

External links

 360° VR panorama gallery of Shiraz

 
 

 
 

 
Cities in Fars Province